The 2016 season of the Indian Premier League, also known as IPL 9, and branded as Vivo IPL 2016 for sponsorship reasons, was the ninth season of the IPL, a professional Twenty20 cricket league established by the Board of Control for Cricket in India (BCCI) in 2007. The season began on 9 April 2016, and concluded on 29 May 2016 with the playing of the finals match between Royal Challengers Bangalore and Sunrisers Hyderabad at M. Chinnaswamy Stadium in Bangalore. The tagline was Fun, fans, fantastic.

The 2016 season was the first IPL season to use LED stumps. Following the suspension of Chennai Super Kings and Rajasthan Royals for two years over a spot-fixing and betting scandal, the IPL allocated spots for two new franchises to take their place. The process would result in the establishment of the Gujarat Lions and Rising Pune Supergiants in 2016.

The championship was won by Sunrisers Hyderabad, marking the Hyderabad franchise's second IPL title, with Ben Cutting declared the man of the match in the final. Virat Kohli of Royal Challengers Bangalore was named the most valuable player of the tournament, and Mustafizur Rahman of Sunrisers Hyderabad was named the emerging player of the season. Virat Kohli of Royal Challengers Bangalore was the tournament's leading run-scorer with 973 runs and Bhuvneshwar Kumar of Sunrisers Hyderabad was the leading wicket-taker of the tournament with 23 wickets. Ever since the introduction of page playoff system, this is the only edition where a team ending outside of the top 2 at the end of league stage won an IPL title and only the third edition along with 2012 and 2021 where one of the top 2 teams missed out on a spot in the final.

Format 
Eight teams contested the season. Two teams, Rising Pune Supergiants and Gujarat Lions, based in Pune and Rajkot were new to the tournament, replacing the Chennai Super Kings and Rajasthan Royals franchises which had been suspended until 2018.

The schedule for the tournament was published on 10 March 2016. The league stage, consisting of 56 matches, took place between 9 April and 22 May 2016. The top four teams qualified for the play-off stage, with the final being held in Bangalore on 29 May.

Background 
On 14 July 2015, the RM Lodha committee suspended the owners of the Chennai Super Kings and Rajasthan Royals franchises for a period of two years on charges of spot-fixing and betting during the 2013 IPL season. This meant that the two teams could not play in the 2016 and 2017 IPL seasons. The Board of Control of Cricket in India (BCCI) confirmed that two new teams will replace them for the next two seasons of the IPL.

In October 2015, PepsiCo withdrew as the title sponsor of the IPL, terminating a five-year deal which was to end in 2017. Chinese smartphone manufacturer Vivo was awarded the title sponsorship for the 2016 and 2017 seasons.

In November 2015, the BCCI shortlisted nine cities for the new franchises to be based in, leaving out Jaipur (home of Rajasthan Royals) and Kochi (home of the now defunct Kochi Tuskers Kerala) for unknown reasons. The nine cities shortlisted were: Chennai, Cuttack, Dharamshala, Indore, Nagpur, Pune, Rajkot, Ranchi and Visakhapatnam. The new franchises were allocated using a reverse auction process, with companies which bid the lowest share of the central revenue pool becoming the owners of the new teams. On 3 December, it was reported that twelve companies collected tender documents for the bidding process.

On 8 December 2015, it was announced that New Rising, a company led by Sanjiv Goenka, and Intex Technologies had won the bidding rights to the two new teams. New Rising decided to have their team based in Pune while Intex chose Rajkot as the home of its team. The two franchises picked five players each from the squads of Chennai Super Kings and Rajasthan Royals at a player draft on 15 December 2015. Each franchise was allocated a purse of 660 million to buy the players for their squad at the draft and players auction.

Maharashtra water crisis 
On 6 April 2016, amid a severe drought situation in the state of Maharashtra, in which three venues (Mumbai, Pune and Nagpur) were supposed to host a total of 20 IPL matches in the 2016 season, the Bombay High Court questioned the "criminal wastage" of water being supplied to the three stadiums in a response to a petition from the Lok Satta Movement NGO. The drought was described as one of the "worst-ever droughts" to affect the state and was believed to be one of the worst droughts in 100 years. An estimated 6 million litres (6 million litres) of water were to be used at the three venues to maintain the pitches, with 4 million litres being used at the Wankhede Stadium, the site of eight matches. The High Court filed a public interest litigation and suggested shifting matches to "some other state where water is in abundance." The High Court questioned the BCCI about whether "people are more important or your IPL matches". The BCCI argued that the water being used at the venues was tanker water and not drinkable.

On 8 April, the Chief Minister of Maharashtra Devendra Fadnavis declared that potable water will not be supplied to the venues and added "even if IPL matches are shifted, we have no problem." On 9 April, hours before the season's opening match, the Mumbai Cricket Association claimed that the water being used at the Wankhede Stadium was bought from private operators and not Brihanmumbai Municipal Corporation.

On 13 April, the Bombay High Court ruled that all the matches to be held in the state in May must be moved to venues outside of Maharashtra. A total of 13 matches were scheduled to be hosted by the three venues in Maharashtra in the month of May, including two playoff matches in Pune and the final in Mumbai. The court later allowed a match scheduled for 1 May to take place in Pune due to logistical difficulties with moving the fixture.

The Mumbai Cricket Association and the Maharashtra Cricket Association petitioned the Supreme Court against the High Court's ruling, filing a plea which stated that treated sewage water will be used instead of potable water. After the Mumbai Indians selected Jaipur as their alternative venue, a petition was filed in the city which stated hosting IPL matches "will add unnecessary burden on the scarce natural resource." The Rajasthan High Court then questioned the state government and BCCI about shifting the matches to Rajasthan, a region also hit by drought, scheduling the hearing for 27 April. There were reports of protests being held in Jaipur against the shifting of matches to the city.

On 26 April the Supreme Court dismissed the petition against the Bombay High Court's ruling and confirmed that matches should be moved out of Maharashtra. The court had initially suggested that a series of regulations could be used to allow matches to go ahead under the condition that no drinkable water was used on the grounds, but opted to instead move the matches on the grounds that the suggested regulations would be complex and difficult to enforce.

On 29 April, it was announced that all league stage matches scheduled to be held after 1 May in Mumbai and Pune were shifted to the Dr. Y.S. Rajasekhara Reddy ACA-VDCA Cricket Stadium in Visakhapatnam. Two playoff matches scheduled to be held in Pune were shifted to Delhi and three Kings XI Punjab home matches supposed to be held in Nagpur were shifted to their primary home venue, Mohali. The M. Chinnaswamy Stadium in Bangalore, which was scheduled to host the Qualifier 1, was also announced as the host of the Final.

Opening ceremony 
The opening ceremony was held on 8 April 2016 from 19:30 IST at the Sardar Vallabhbhai Patel Stadium in Mumbai. It featured performances from Major Lazer, Yo Yo Honey Singh, Ranveer Singh, Katrina Kaif, Jacqueline Fernandez among others. Dwayne Bravo, a member of the West Indies' 2016 World Twenty20 winning team, performed the "Champion Dance", which, according to the IPL chairman Rajeev Shukla, was supposed to be the "special attraction" of the ceremony.

Venues 
Ten venues were selected to host the league stage matches. Bangalore hosted Qualifier 1, Pune was scheduled to host the Eliminator match and Qualifier 2 and Mumbai was scheduled to host the final. The drought situation in Maharashtra led to a ruling in the Bombay High Court that games to be played in the state, including in Pune and Mumbai, in May would have to be moved to other regions to allow water supplies to be prioritised. On 29 April 2016, the IPL Governing Council announced that all homes games of the Mumbai Indians and Rising Pune Supergiants after 2 May 2016, would be held at Visakhapatnam. The Eliminator and Qualifier 2 would to be held at Delhi, and the final at Bangalore. On 2 May 2016, it was announced that Gujarat Lions would play two of their matches on 19 and 21 May at Kanpur.

Personnel changes 

Each franchise was able to retain players from the previous season of the tournament, with their salaries automatically deducted from the franchise's available salary purse. The new teams were able to draft five players each from the two suspended franchises. Players were able to be traded during the trading windows and new players could be added to the teams at the 2016 IPL players auction held on 6 February 2016.

Teams and standings

Points table

Match summary

League stage

Match results 

{{Limited overs matches | date =  14 May | time = 16:00 | team1 = (H)Royal Challengers Bangalore | team2 = Gujarat Lions | daynight = yes
| score1 = 248/3 (20 overs)
| score2 = 104 (18.4 overs)
| runs1 = AB de Villiers 129* (52)
| wickets1 = Praveen Kumar 2/45 (4 overs)
| runs2 = Aaron Finch 37 (38)
| wickets2 = Chris Jordan 4/11 (3 overs)
| venue = M. Chinnaswamy Stadium, Bangalore
| toss = Gujarat Lions won the toss and elected to field.
| notes = The 229-run partnership between Virat Kohli and AB de Villiers is the highest partnership for any wicket in T20 cricket history.
It was the first instance of two batsmen scoring hundreds in the same match in the IPL, and the second overall instance in a T20 match.
| motm = AB de Villiers (Royal Challengers Bangalore)
| umpires = Anil Dandekar (India) and Virender Sharma (India)
| report = Scorecard
| result = Royal Challengers Bangalore won by 144 runs
}}

 Playoff stage 

 Preliminary 

 Qualifier 1 

 Eliminator 

 Qualifier 2 

 Final 

 Statistics and awards

 Most runs 

  The player with the most runs at the end of the tournament received the Orange Cap.
 Source: Cricinfo

 Most wickets 

  The player with the most wickets at the end of the tournament received the Purple Cap.
 Source: Cricinfo

Special awards

 Source: 

 Reception 

 Television viewing 
The first six matches of the season recorded an average Television Viewership Rating (TVR) of 3.50, significantly less than the average TVR of 4.50 for the first week of the 2015 IPL season. It was the second lowest TVR recorded in the opening week of any IPL season, with only the 2014 season with a rating below this.

 Attendance 
According to a report in the Economic Times'', the season's opening matches at Delhi, Mohali and Kolkata had an average attendance of 60% each, while the first game at Hyderabad had a 50% crowd turnout. The low attendance figures were attributed to "an overdose of Twenty20 cricket and scorching heat". After Bangalore had low attendances in the first two matches at the venue, ticket prices were reduced.

Average home attendances:

Kolkata Knight Riders 52,800
Delhi Daredevils 32,800
Chennai Super Kings 30,400
Royal Challengers Bangalore 28,000
Mumbai Indians 26,486
Sunrisers Hyderabad 26,400
Kings XI Punjab 20,800
Rajasthan Royals 18,548

References

External links 
 Series home on ESPN Cricinfo

 
Indian Premier League seasons
Indian Premier League
2016 in Indian cricket